Oscar Edward "Hub" Knolls (December 18, 1883 – July 1, 1946) was a pitcher in Major League Baseball. He pitched in two games for the 1906 Brooklyn Superbas.

A double in his only at-bat left Knolls with a rare MLB career batting average of 1.000.

External links

1883 births
1946 deaths
Baseball players from Indiana
Major League Baseball pitchers
Brooklyn Superbas players
Evansville River Rats players
Johnstown Johnnies players
Trenton Tigers players